The Carignan-Salières Regiment was a Piedmont French military unit formed by merging two other regiments in 1659. They were led by the new Governor, Daniel de Rémy de Courcelles, and Lieutenant-General Alexandre de Prouville, Sieur de Tracy. Approximately 1,200 men (Piedmont, Savoyard and Ligurian) arrived in New France in the middle of 1665.

Formation
The Carignan-Salières was formed from two existing regiments: the Balthasar Regiment, formed during the Thirty Years' War and becoming the Salières when Balthasar died in 1665, and the Carignan Regiment, formed in 1644 in Piedmont. Following the Treaty of the Pyrenees in 1659, both regiments avoided disbandment by merging to form the Carignan-Salières Regiment.

Crisis In New France
New France was initially a proprietary colony granted by the French Crown to various corporations to rule provided they fulfilled various terms of their charters like supporting the missionary work of the Roman Catholic Church amongst the Autochtones. After the successive bankruptcies of the various corporations which had previously received royal charters, in 1627, trading in New France was granted by the Crown to the Compagnie des Cent-Associés ("Company of 100 Associates"), who gained exclusive rights to rule New France, provided they fulfilled the terms of the royal charter. In 1649, the Iroquois began the Beaver Wars to take control of the fur trade by eliminating other middlemen, which also embroiled them in conflict with the French. In 1649, the Iroquois destroyed the enervated Wendat (Huron) nation, whose homeland, Wendake, lies in what is now southern Ontario, bordered on three sides by Lake Ontario, Lake Simcoe and Georgian Bay; it was through Wendake that the Ojibwa and Cree, who lived further north, traded with the French. The destruction of the Wendat nation destabilized the fur trade for the French, and the Odawa quickly took their place as the middlemen, bringing furs from the northern lands to Montreal, as did coureurs de bois.

The Compagnie des Cent-Associés barely hung on against the Iroquois onslaught, with Iroquois war parties intercepting canoes carrying furs to Montreal, cutting off French forts, raiding French settlements along the banks of the St. Lawrence river to carry off captives, and sometimes laying out iron chains they had obtained from the Dutch to blockade the St. Lawrence to prevent ships from using the river. By 1660, the total population  of New France was 3,035 with about 1,928 being French. There were about 900 people living in Quebec City and about 200 each in Montreal and Trois-Rivières, and the rest spread out in small settlements along the St. Lawrence. The white population of New France was 63% male and most worked in some capacity in the fur trade. The Compagnie des Cent-Associés fulfilled the terms of its royal charter to bring settlers to New France, but most were indentured laborers who left New France at the end of their five-year contracts. The harsh winters, the shortage of women, and the threat of being carried off by the Iroquois led to very few Frenchmen wanting to stay, and unable to build the population, the Compagnie des Cent-Associés simply lacked the manpower to counter the Iroquois. Throughout the struggle, the authorities in New France sent desperate appeals for help to Paris, only to be informed France was fully engaged in a war with Spain that did not end until 1659 and there were no soldiers to spare to send to New France. Additionally, France was caught in a series of civil wars known as the Fronde in the 1650s, and with Frenchmen busy killing each other, it was inconceivable to send a force across the Atlantic. But even after the Peace of the Pyrenees ended the war with Spain in 1659, the Crown remained indifferent to New France. In 1661, Pierre Boucher, the governor of Trois-Rivières, visited Paris to beg for help, saying that people in Trois-Rivières were afraid to go outside without a weapon lest they be carried off by the Iroquois, only to be politely told that the responsibility of the defense of  New France rested with the Compagnie des Cent-Associés, not the Crown. Unable to turn a profit with the "Beaver Wars" raging, the Compagnie des Cent-Associés went bankrupt in 1663 and New France became a Crown colony ruled directly by the French state. The immediate concern of King Louis XIV was to make the new Crown colony turn a profit, which would require ending the Iroquois threat.

In 1664, following the request of the Sovereign Council, the French finance minister Jean-Baptiste Colbert ordered the Carignan-Salières to reinforce the existing 100 man force in New France. This reinforcement was as much, if not more, motivated by mercantile ambitions than actual cries for help from New France. In a letter to Bishop François Laval written on 18 March 1664, Colbert promised him: "His Majesty has resolved to send a good regiment of infantry at the end of the year, or in the month of February next, in order to destroy these barbarians [the Iroquois] completely". Louis XIV had ambitious foreign policy plans for Europe, most notably pushing France to its "natural frontiers", and Colbert had promoted a mercantile economic policy to pay for the projected wars in Europe. Colbert had hopes that if New France was properly developed, it could play the same role for France that Peru and Mexico did for Spain, providing a source of wealth that would pay for the wars to come. Louis, Colbert and other French leaders were envious of the way that the gold and silver of the New World had allowed Spain to afford a powerful military, and very much wanted New France to play the same role for them. By now the regiment had been reduced to eight companies of about 400 troops; this was insufficient to meet King Louis XIV's demand for a large military force. The regiment's strength was increased to 20 companies and 1000 troops by absorbing 12 other French companies, including those from the Lallier, Chambellé, Poitou, and Broglio regiments. A popular erroneous story in New France was that the regiment had fought in the Austro-Turkish War of 1663–64; the story may have arisen from troops of the 12 new companies, many of whom may have fought in that war.

Four companies under Alexandre de Prouville joined the Carignan-Salières in New France from Martinique; de Prouville companies were attached to, but never formally integrated into, the Carignan-Salières.

Leadership
The following were members of the leadership hierarchy in New France during the regiment's stay:

Lieutenant-General in command of French America: Alexandre de Prouville de Tracy
Governor of New France: Daniel de Rémy de Courcelles
Intendent: Jean Talon
Commanding Officer: Henri de Chastelard de Salières (in charge of seven companies)
Surgeon Major: Vincent Basset du Tartre

Arrival in New France

The following is a list of ships that carried the Carignan-Salières Regiment from France to New France in 1665.

Seven ships were required to transport the regiment to New France. The first, Le Vieux Siméon, departed La Rochelle 19 April 1665, arriving at Quebec 1 July 1665. On board were the companies of La Fouille, Froment, Chambly and Rougment. The arrival of the first companies of the regiment at one stroke increased the population of Quebec City by 25%, and an immediate problem was building housing for the newly arrived soldiers who at first had to camp out in tents outside Quebec City. The Le Vieux Siméon was a Dutch ship chartered by a La Rochelle merchant, Pierre Gaigneur, who was well-experienced sailing between France and its colonies.

The next two ships to depart from France were La Paix and L’Aigle d’Or. The former carried the companies of La Colonelle, celles de Contrecoeur, Maximy, and Sorel, and on board the latter were de Salières, La Fredière, Grandfontaine and La Motte. These both were royal ships of the king's navy that departed from La Rochelle 13 May 1665, arriving at Quebec 18 August 1665.

The following two ships were also royal vessels: Le Saint Sébastian and La Justice. Aboard Le Saint Sébastian, amongst these next seven companies being transported to New France, were the newly appointed Intendant of New France, Jean Talon, and the Governor Daniel de Rémy de Courcelles. Aboard the final two ships were the companies of Du Prat, Naurois, Laubia, Saint-Ours, Petit, La Varenne, Vernon. These last two ships to depart from France left La Rochelle 24 May 1665, arriving at Quebec 12 September 1665.

Four companies arrived with Alexandre de Prouville de Tracy on the Brézé from the Antilles, arriving in New France 30 June 1665. The captains of these companies were La Durantaye (Chambellé), Berthier (L'Allier), La Brisardière (Orléans), Monteil (Poitou). Tracy had been in the West Indies as part of his royal commission to officially establish Louis XIV's rule of the French colonies, following the King's takeover of the French territories after the bankruptcy of the Company of 100 Associates.

The last ship to sail from France associated with the regiment was the Jardin de Hollande which carried the provisions and equipment for the troops.

Depending on sources, there are some contradictions as to when ships arrived in New France and what companies were on board said ships.

Reception in New France
They were welcomed as saviours, particularly by Mother Marie of the Incarnation, head of the local convent, who wrote of their arrival:

Although Mother Marie viewed them as saviors, modern day scholars like Jack Verney argue that their mission, contrary to what she states, was "a secular rather than sacred one".Jean-Baptiste Colbert wanted to develop the colony's economic potential. After requiring that the Company of One Hundred Associates (Compagnie de la Nouvelle-France) relinquish its monopoly on trade in 1663, Louis XIV and his minister finally had the control they needed to develop the colony's economic potential.

In Montreal, the Sulpician priest, François Dollier de Casson, reacted to the soldiers negatively, saying that "vices which have, in fact, risen and grown here since that time [when the troops arrived], along with many other troubles and misfortunes which had not up to that time made their appearance here".

In Verney's view, this is a much more realistic account of how the men had "marked their progress along the road to La Rochelle with outbreaks of disorder and indiscipline".

Fort building
The regiment's service in New France began when a third of them were ordered to build new forts along the Richelieu River, the principal route of the Iroquois marauders. Fort Chambly formerly known as Fort St. Louis at Chambly, Fort Sainte Thérèse, and Fort Saint-Jean at Saint-Jean-sur-Richelieu, were along the Richelieu River and were constructed as ways to limit Iroquois nation attacks on citizens of New France. Fort Sainte Anne in Lake Champlain was near the river's source. All of the forts were used as supply stations for the troops as they were deployed on their two campaigns into Iroquois nation land in 1666.

Fort Chambly as constructed in 1665 was the first wooden fort constructed in New France and had a rudimentary wood wall system with a building in the center of the fort. Inside, and near the center building, were small buildings for the troops.

Campaigns

First campaign 
The first of the regiment's campaign took place in the winter of 1666. The expedition was initiated by the governor, Daniel de Rémy de Courcelles. General Alexandre de Prouville de Tracy agreed to the campaign after the Mohawks refused to attend a delegation of the Iroquois nations and French leaders in Montreal in November 1665. At this delegation the French entered into agreements with the Oneida and Onondaga nations of the Iroquois Confederacy, who were there to represent themselves as well as the Cayugas and the Senecas. Tracy interpreted the Mohawk absence as signalling a threatening lack of intimidation by the presence of the Carignan-Salières soldiers.

The Marquis de Salières, recognized that the winter campaign would not succeed without basic necessities such as proper clothing, shoes and cooking equipment. Marquis de Salières thought that this endeavour was impossible, stating in his memoirs that:

The men left 30 January 1666 under the orders of Courcelles, despite the fact that their Native guides had not yet arrived. Indeed, this campaign also differed greatly from the European tradition of not campaigning in winter. The campaign was made up of about five hundred men of regimental soldiers, a number of Indians, and an estimated 200 volunteer habitants. The column ended up getting lost, wandering in the wilderness for three weeks before ending up on the outskirts of the Anglo-Dutch settlement of Schenectady. The soldiers came across a village that they assumed was Mohawk and launched a brutal attack, ravaging the village and killing two and severely wounding another two.

The sounds of the battle were overheard by a passing Mohawk party composed of approximately sixty warriors. The French and Mohawks engaged in a small skirmish which resulted in a small number of casualties on both sides. The French troops were at a tactical disadvantage as they were used to the pitched battles regulated by rigid drills commonly used in Continental Europe. Despite the experience of the soldiers of the Carignan-Salières Regiment, their tactics were useless against the hit-and-run tactics used by the Mohawks. The fighting ended when the burgomaster of Schenectady informed Courcelles that he was in the territory of the Duke of York. The burgomaster implied that if the French chose to stay in the settlement they would be vulnerable to attacks by both Indians and the English units stationed at Schenectady and Albany (less than 25 kilometres away). The French stopped the attack and the burgomaster agreed to provide the men with some provisions for their return journey.

The campaign was ultimately a failure. Nothing was accomplished and the regiment sustained great losses; 400 out of 500 died. Due to the hastiness with which the campaign had been launched and the harshness of the weather, most of the deaths occurred while travelling from and to Fort St-Louis. When Courcelles commanded that the troops were to meet at Fort St-Louis at the end of January, he said that they should be prepared with three weeks worth of provisions. In total, the expedition took a little over five weeks to complete. What is more, the men were ill-equipped—many left the fort without snowshoes—which contributed significantly to the campaign's death toll.

Second campaign 
The regiment's second and final campaign was led by Alexandre de Prouville de Tracy. The plan was to enter into Mohawk territory, located northwest of Schenectady along what is now the Mohawk River. The necessity of the campaign was created by the declaration of the Second Anglo-Dutch War in the summer of 1666. King Louis XIV wanted de Tracy to lead the men into the same area where they were the last year near Albany and Schenectady. However, it was first necessary for the French to subdue the Mohawks to protect themselves from facing multiple fronts against both the English and Mohawks. In addition, they wanted to ensure that their two opponents would not ally themselves against the French. The destruction of four Mohawk villages was the most important outcome of the venture. However, there was no real fighting as the villages the regiment came across had been abandoned prior to the arrival of the regiment.

The plan was for the regiment to regroup at Fort Sainte Anne on the 28 and push into Mohawk territory on 29 September 1666. The Late arriving of several parties meant the regiment left in three separate columns over a period of three days. The number of men available in the campaign was approximately 120 regimental soldiers, habitants and Native warriors. Because de Tracy sought to use the element of surprise and swiftly move into enemy territory, he ordered his soldiers to travel light. Thus, from the beginning of the campaign, the Regiment's situation was precarious as the soldiers brought insufficient provisions and did not carry the necessary equipment for a lengthy assault. Inclement weather added to the danger of the mission and further threatened the campaign's success.

As it moved inland, the regiment encountered four Mohawk villages all of which had been abandoned. The fact that the Mohawks abandoned their villages was fortuitous for the regiment since it was not operating at full strength and the soldiers were stretched over a large area. At this point in the campaign, the regiment probably would not have been able to withstand a large-scale attack. What is more, the villages were hastily abandoned thus providing the French troops with a supply of food, tools, weapons, and other provisions. After regrouping at the last of the four villages, Tracy ordered the soldiers to turn around and burn each one as they went, carrying all the loot they could back to Quebec. The Mohawks, though skilled in guerilla fighting, were caught by surprise by the speed of the French attack and were unable to engage the French. On 17 October 1666, the lands and fields surrounding the Mohawk villages were all claimed as French territory and crosses were erected to symbolize that claim. However, the French never returned to the area to enforce this territorial claim.

Despite the fact that the French troops had not directly engaged the Mohawks or the English, the campaign was considered a great success; the French finally assumed a position of tactical superiority over the Mohawk and Iroquois Confederacy which in turn gave the French a diplomatic advantage in the following peace talks. In July 1667, peace was signed with the Iroquois following a five-day summit. The main objective of the French during the negotiations was to consolidate their control of the fur trade at the expense of the Anglo-Dutch interests in Albany. They sought to do so by placing themselves in a position that allowed them to oversee the traffic of the fur trade in the region. As a result, the French were able to place French-speaking traders as well as Jesuits in a number of Iroquois village. To ensure the success of this agreement as well as the security of the traders and missionaries, a system of hostages was implemented. Each Iroquois village was required to send two members of a leading family to live among in the St. Lawrence Valley. Following the ratification of the treaties of 1667, the peace was kept in the region for twenty years. The peace treaties of 1667 also signaled the end of the regiment's operations in New France. Nonetheless, the troops of the Carignan-Salières Regiment were held in duty until another means of protecting New France could be devised.

Troop life

Religion 
Even though the Edict of Nantes in 1598 had allowed French Protestants to live in France, the law was not always observed in the colonies. The king had given huge power to the Jesuit order by making it part of New France's government. So, when Bishop de Laval discovered the significant numbers of unconfirmed Catholics and even some French Protestants within the ranks of the regiment, drastic measures were taken. Jesuit Father Claude Dablon gave two emergency sermons within five days of the first eight companies landing in New France to reaffirm the relapsed and unconfirmed Catholics in the regiment.

Equipment 
The first regulars of the Carignan-Salières were dressed for "efficiency rather than looks". Additionally, the soldiers were rather poorly equipped during their first year. In the duration of one year, the king had sent only 200 flintlocks as well as 100 pistols for a troop force of over 1,200 men. Below are descriptions of some of the equipment used:

Powder horn: used to store gunpowder for firing their weapons.
Black powder: used to arm and fire the newly issued muskets of the regiment.
Sword: used commonly for hand-to-hand fighting and every soldier had one.
Flintlock musket: became the main weapon of long range fighting for the Carignan-Salières. It replaced the matchlock musket that was common in early years due to its increased reliability and ability to be fired without the use of an external flame. Additionally, it was capable of a much higher rate of fire than the earlier matchlock.
Bayonet: the Carignan-Salières were one of the first regiments to transition to the bayonet, which was introduced in 1647.
Pistol: a standard issue weapon but was not in high-supplies in New France.
Slouch hat: was worn in place of later tricorn hats. It was better at repelling rain and wind from the faces of soldiers.
Uniform: The Carignan-Salières wore brown coats with contrasting colour sleeves. The Carignan-Salières were one of the first French forces to wear uniforms.

Notable people 
 

Hugues Randin (1628–c. 1680), French engineer

Departure and settlement in Canada
With the end to the Iroquois threat, King Louis XIV decided to offer the men of the regiment an opportunity to stay in New France to help increase the population. As incentive, regular officers were offered 100 livres or 50 livres and a year worth of rations. Lieutenants, alternatively, were offered 150 livres or 100 livres and a year worth of rations. Officers were also offered the incentive of large land grants in the forms of seigneuries. This offer was particularly beneficial to such men as Pierre de Saurel, Alexandre Berthier, Antoine Pécaudy de Contrecœur, and François Jarret de Verchères, who were granted large seigneuries in New France.

Although the majority of the regiment returned to France in 1668, about 450 remained behind to settle in Canada. These men were highly encouraged to marry, being offered land as incentive. As a result, most of them did marry newly arriving women to the colony known as Filles du Roi. The largest import of women to New France occurred during the 1660s and early 1670s, largely in response to the need to provide wives for the regiment.

Besides just rewarding Carignan-Salières officers by granting them seigneurial tenures, the tenure properties served an ulterior purpose. The properties granted to Contrecœur and Saurel were placed in strategic areas that could be used as a buffer between invaders both foreign (the British) as well as domestic (the Iroquois). It was believed that the men of the Carignan-Salières would be the colonists best suited to defend the territories of New France, therefore many of them were given properties on the Richelieu river and other areas prone to attack. These Seigneurs would sub grant land to the men of their companies in order to create an even more thoroughly reinforced zone. Saurel's land would later be known as Sorel-Tracy in Quebec, while Contrecœur's property would later become a region named after himself.

The French had a practice of allotting noms de guerre – nicknames – to their soldiers (this is still continued, but for different reasons, in the Foreign Legion). Many of these nicknames remain today as they gradually became the official surnames of the many soldiers who elected to remain in Canada when their service expired as well as the names of cities and towns throughout New France.

Names after departure from Canada
1677: Renamed Régiment de Soissons
1690: Renamed Régiment de Perche
1744: Renamed Gardes de Lorraine
1766: Renamed Régiment de Lorraine
1791: 47e Régiment d'Infanterie
1793: 47e demi-brigade de bataille

References

External links

Regimental Lineage Chart by John P. DuLong, PhD
List of members of the Carignan-Salières Regiment

Military units and formations established in 1659
Military units and formations disestablished in 1794
Line infantry regiments of the Ancien Régime